Kingoué is a district in the Bouenza Department of Republic of the Congo.

References 

Bouenza Department
Districts of the Republic of the Congo